The 2022 Open Bogotá was a professional tennis tournament played on clay courts. It was the fourteenth edition of the tournament which was part of the 2022 ATP Challenger Tour. It took place in Bogotá, Colombia between 4 and 10 July 2022.

Singles main-draw entrants

Seeds

 1 Rankings are as of 27 June 2022.

Other entrants
The following players received wildcards into the singles main draw:
  Nicolás Buitrago
  Sergio Luis Hernández Ramírez
  Andrés Urrea

The following players received entry from the qualifying draw:
  Mateus Alves
  Blu Baker
  Arklon Huertas del Pino
  Ignacio Monzón
  Naoki Nakagawa
  Matías Zukas

The following player received entry as a lucky loser:
  Mukund Sasikumar

Champions

Singles

  Juan Pablo Ficovich def.  Gerald Melzer 6–1, 6–2.

Doubles

  Nicolás Mejía /  Andrés Urrea def.  Ignacio Monzón /  Gonzalo Villanueva 6–3, 6–4.

References

2022 ATP Challenger Tour
2022
2022 in Colombian tennis
July 2022 sports events in Colombia